New Harbour or New Harbor can mean:

In Antarctica
New Harbour (Antarctica) (sometimes spelt New Harbor)
New Harbour Heights, former name of Mount Barnes in the Kukri Hills, Antarctica

In Australia
New Harbour, Tasmania

In Canada
New Harbour, Newfoundland and Labrador
New Harbour Island, Newfoundland and Labrador
New Harbour, Nova Scotia
New Harbour (Chester), Nova Scotia

In Gibraltar
New Harbours, an industrial complex in Gibraltar

In Singapore
New Harbour, former name of Keppel Harbour, Singapore

In the United States
New Harbor, Maine
New Harbour Mall, Fall River, Massachusetts

See also
 Nyhavn, "New Harbour" in Danish